The Lower Mainland is a geographic and cultural region of the mainland coast of British Columbia that generally comprises the regional districts of Metro Vancouver and Fraser Valley. Home to approximately 3.05million people as of the 2021 Canadian census, the Lower Mainland contains sixteen of the province's 30 most populous municipalities and approximately 60% of the province's total population.

The region is the traditional territory of the Sto:lo, a Halkomelem-speaking people of the Coast Salish linguistic and cultural grouping.

Boundaries
Although the term Lower Mainland has been recorded from the earliest period of colonization in British Columbia, it has never been officially defined in legal terms. The term has historically been in popular usage for over a century to describe a region that extends from Horseshoe Bay south to the Canada–United States border and east to Hope at the eastern end of the Fraser Valley. This definition makes the term Lower Mainland almost synonymous with the regional districts of Metro Vancouver and Fraser Valley.

However, the British Columbia Geographical Names Information System (BCGNIS) comments that most residents of Vancouver might consider it to be only areas west of Mission and Abbotsford, while residents in the rest of the province consider it to be the Sea-to-Sky Corridor south of Whistler and west of Hope.

Geography

The region is bounded to the north by the Pacific Ranges and to the southeast by the Cascade Mountains, and is traversed from east to west by the Fraser River. Due to its consistency of climate, flora and fauna, geology and land use, "Lower Mainland" is also the name of an ecoregion—a biogeoclimatic region—that comprises the eastern part of the Georgia Depression and extends from Powell River on the Sunshine Coast to Hope at the eastern end of the Fraser Valley.

Climate
Maximum precipitation occurs as rain in winter. Less than ten percent falls as snow at sea level but the amount of snowfall increases significantly with elevation.

Demographics

Population
As of the 2021 census, the population of the Lower Mainland core area totals 2,966,830:
 2,642,825 in Metro Vancouver Regional District
 324,005 in the Fraser Valley Regional District

These figures are slightly inflated due to the inclusion of areas within the Regional Districts which are not normally considered to be part of the Lower Mainland, notably the lower Fraser Canyon and the heads of Harrison and Pitt Lakes, which are within the FVRD, and Lions Bay and Bowen Island, which are within the Metro Vancouver Regional District.

Ethnicity

The Lower Mainland is among the most multicultural and diverse regions in Canada. 

As of 2021, Europeans form a plurality with 1,337,105 persons or 45.7 percent of the total population, followed by East Asians with 614,860 persons or 21.0 percent and South Asians with 422,880 persons or 14.5 percent.

Religion

The Lower Mainland includes large Irreligious, Christian, and Sikh communities. The Sikh population, numbering over 265,000 persons or 9.1 percent of the total population is statistically significant across Metro Vancouver and the Fraser Valley; proportionally, it is more than four times the national average of 2.1 percent.

Language

Regional districts
Regional districts were first created across British Columbia in 1966–1967 to form bodies for inter-municipal coordination and to extend municipal-level powers to areas outside existing municipalities. Today, the Lower Mainland includes two regional districts: the Metro Vancouver Regional District (MVRD) and the Fraser Valley Regional District (FVRD). Both regional districts, however, include areas outside the traditional limits of the Lower Mainland. Metro Vancouver includes areas like Surrey and Langley that are geographically in the Fraser Valley.

The Metro Vancouver Regional District is made up of 21 municipalities. The MVRD is bordered on the west by the Strait of Georgia, to the north by the Squamish-Lillooet Regional District, on the east by the Fraser Valley Regional District, and to the south by Whatcom County, Washington, in the United States.

The Fraser Valley Regional District lies east of the Metro Vancouver Regional District, and comprises the cities of Abbotsford and Chilliwack, the district municipalities of Mission, Kent, and Hope, and the village of Harrison Hot Springs. It also includes many unincorporated areas in the Fraser Valley and along the west side of the Fraser Canyon (the Fraser Canyon is not in the Lower Mainland).

Regional district powers are very limited and other localized provincial government services are delivered through other regionalization systems.

Indigenous territories
The traditional territories of the Musqueam and Tsleil'waututh lie completely within the region; the southern portion of Squamish traditional territory is also in the region. Its claims overlap those of the Tsleil-waututh, Musqueam, and Kwikwetlem. Other peoples whose territories lie within the region are the Sto:lo, Chehalis, Katzie, Kwantlen, Tsawwassen, and Semiahmoo; many of their territories overlap with those of the Musqueam, and with each other. Many other peoples of the Georgia Strait region also frequented the lower Fraser, including those from Vancouver Island and what is now Whatcom County, Washington.

Sto:lo traditional territory, known as Solh Temexw in Halkomelem, more or less coincides with the traditional conception of the Lower Mainland, except for the inclusion of Port Douglas at the head of Harrison Lake, which is in In-SHUCK-ch territory, and the lands around Burrard Inlet.

Health regions
Health system services and governance in the Lower Mainland are provided by Vancouver Coastal Health, serving Vancouver, Richmond and the North Shore, and the mainland coast as far north as the Central Coast region, and Fraser Health, which serves the area of the Lower Mainland east of Vancouver and Richmond.

Natural threats

Flooding
The Lower Mainland is considered to have a high vulnerability to flood risk. There have been two major region-wide floods in 1894 and 1948, both associated with an extreme spring freshet of the Fraser River. Other major floods in the Lower Mainlandincluding June 1972, November 1990, and November 2021have been more localized, primarily impacting areas in the Fraser Valley like the Sumas Prairie, with comparatively minor impacts to Metro Vancouver. Prior to the 2021 flood, according to the Fraser Basin Council, scientists predicted a one-in-three chance of a similar-sized flood occurring in the next 50 years.

In the second quarter of 2007, the Lower Mainland was on high alert for flooding. Higher than normal snow packs in the British Columbia Interior prompted municipal governments to start taking emergency measures in the region. Warmer than normal weather in the province's Interior region caused large amounts of snow to melt prematurely, resulting in higher-than-normal water levels, which, nevertheless, remained well below flood levels.

Flooding can cover much of the Lower Mainland. Cloverdale, Barnston Island, low-lying areas of Maple Ridge, areas west of Hope, White Rock, Richmond, parts of Vancouver, and parts of Surrey are potentially at risk. In 2007, the Lower Mainland was largely spared, although northern regions of the province, along the Skeena and Nechako Rivers, experienced floods. Climate scientists predict that increasing temperatures will mean wetter winters and more snow at the high elevations. This will increase the likelihood of snowmelt floods.

The provincial government maintains an integrated flood hazard management program and extensive flood protection infrastructure in the Lower Mainland. The infrastructure consists of dikes, pump stations, floodboxes, riprap, and relief wells.

Earthquakes
While earthquakes are common in British Columbia and adjacent coastal waters, most are minor in energy release or are sufficiently remote to have little effect on populated areas. Nevertheless, earthquakes with a magnitude of up to 7.3 have occurred within  of the Lower Mainland.

Based on geological evidence, however, stronger earthquakes appear to have occurred at approximately 600-year intervals. Therefore, there is a probability that there will be a major earthquake in the region within the next 200 years.

In April 2008, the United States Geological Survey released information concerning a newly found fault south of downtown Abbotsford, called the Boulder Creek Fault. Scientists now believe this fault is active and capable of producing earthquakes in the 6.8 magnitude range.

Volcanoes
Much of the Lower Mainland is vulnerable to explosive eruptions from the Garibaldi Volcanic Belt. Volcanoes in this zone are capable of producing large quantities of volcanic ash that may cause short and long term water supply problems for Lower Mainland communities. All airports covered by the accompanying eruption column would be closed, heavy ash falls would damage electrical equipment and weak structures could collapse under the weight of the ash.

Communities
The Lower Mainland's communities includes large cities in Metro Vancouver, and smaller cities, towns and villages along both banks of the Fraser River. Neighbourhoods within cities are not listed unless historically or otherwise notable and/or separate. Only some of the many Indian Reserves are listed.

Upper Fraser Valley

 Agassiz
 Bridal Falls
 Chehalis
 Chilliwack
 Cultus Lake
 Greendale
 Lake Errock
 Kent
 Harrison Hot Springs
 Harrison Mills
 Hope
 Flood
 Laidlaw
 Popkum
 Rosedale
 Ruby Creek
 Sardis
 Yarrow

Central Fraser Valley

 Abbotsford
 Aldergrove
 Bradner
 Clayburn
 Clearbrook
 Deroche
 Dewdney
 Durieu
 Hatzic
 Huntingdon
 Matsqui
 Mission
 Mount Lehman
 Nicomen Island
 Ruskin
 Silverdale
 Silverhill
 Squamish
 Stave Falls
 Steelhead
 Sumas (Sumas Prairie)
 Whonnock

Lower Fraser Valley / Metro Vancouver

 Albion
 Anmore
 Annieville
 Barnston Island
 Belcarra
 Boundary Bay
 Bridgeport
 Brighouse
 Burnaby
 Burquitlam
 Cloverdale
 Coquitlam
 Crescent Beach
 Derby ("Old Derby")
 Douglas
 Delta
 Fort Langley
 Haney
 Kanaka Creek
 Langley City
 Langley District
 Lions Bay
 Maillardville
 Maple Ridge
 New Westminster
 Newton
 North Vancouver City
 North Vancouver District
 Pitt Meadows
 Port Coquitlam
 Port Hammond (Hammond)
 Port Kells
 Port Moody
 Queensborough
 Richmond
 Sapperton
 Scottsdale
 Steveston
 Surrey
 Tsawwassen
 Vancouver
 West Vancouver
 Whalley
 White Rock
 Yennadon

See also
 Fraser Lowland
 List of provincial parks of the Lower Mainland

Notes

References

External links

 
South Coast of British Columbia
Geography of Vancouver